Prince of Morocco may refer to:

 a character in William Shakespeare's The Merchant of Venice
Moulay Hassan, Crown Prince of Morocco
Prince Moulay Abdallah of Morocco
Prince Moulay Hicham of Morocco
Prince Moulay Rachid of Morocco